Sandy Shore Recreation Area is a South Dakota State Recreation Area in east-central South Dakota, United States, near Watertown. The recreation area is located on the shore of Lake Kampeska, a 5,250-acre (21 km2) inland glacial lake. Within the recreation area is a beach, boat ramp, 17-site campground and canoe/kayak rentals. At 19 acres in size, it is South Dakota's smallest state park.

See also
List of South Dakota state parks

References

External links
Sandy Shore Recreation Area, South Dakota Department of Game, Fish and Parks

Protected areas of Codington County, South Dakota
Protected areas of South Dakota
State parks of South Dakota